Rifatullah Shinwari (born 22 December 1994) is an Afghan cricketer. He made his List A debut for Boost Region in the 2019 Ghazi Amanullah Khan Regional One Day Tournament on 16 September 2019. He made his Twenty20 debut for Band-e-Amir Dragons in the 2019 Shpageeza Cricket League on 14 October 2019.

References

External links
 

1994 births
Living people
Afghan cricketers
Boost Defenders cricketers
Place of birth missing (living people)